Gary D. Finch (born March 13, 1944) is an American politician who served as a member of the New York State Assembly from 1999 to 2021.

Early life and education 
Finch was born in Auburn, New York and attended Cayuga Community College. He received a degree from the Simmons School of Mortuary Science in 1966. He also earned a Bachelor of Science degree in public administration and political theory from Empire State College (State University of New York) in 1989.

Career 
Since 1970, Finch has owned and operated Brew-Finch Funeral Homes, Inc. a company which operates funeral homes in central New York State. Finch's first elected position was as a trustee for the Village of Aurora in 1979. He then was elected mayor of the village in 1982, a position he held for eight years.

Finch was first elected to the State Assembly on November 2, 1999. He won the November 2008 general election with 65 percent of the vote and ran uncontested in the November 2010 general election.

He serves as assistant minority leader of the minority conference, and is assigned to the Assembly committees on Agriculture, Banks, Corrections, Insurance and Rules.

Personal life 
He lives in the town of Springport with his wife, Marcia Herrling Finch and their two children, Amy and Gregory.

References

External links
New York State Assembly Member Website

1944 births
Living people
Politicians from Auburn, New York
Republican Party members of the New York State Assembly
Empire State College alumni
21st-century American politicians